Dyspessa karatavica is a moth in the family Cossidae. It was described by Yakovlev in 2007. It is found in Kazakhstan.

The length of the forewings is 10 mm for males and 10–12 mm for females. The forewings are yellowish brown, the basal area suffused with brownish scales. The hindwings are light yellowish.

References

Natural History Museum Lepidoptera generic names catalog

Moths described in 2007
Dyspessa
Moths of Asia